The Peddie School is a college preparatory school in Hightstown, in Mercer County, New Jersey, United States. It is a non-denominational, coeducational boarding school located on a  campus, and serves students in the ninth through twelfth grades, plus a small post-graduate class. The school has been accredited by the Middle States Association of Colleges and Schools Commission on Elementary and Secondary Schools since 1928.

In its 2015 rankings, Business Insider ranked the school's tuition as the 18th most expensive private high school tuition in the United States, with tuition and fees of $44,800. The site ranked Peddie 13th on its 2015 list of the Most Elite Boarding Schools In The US, with rankings based on the size of each school's endowment, average SAT scores and selectivity. The school is also extremely selective, with an acceptance rate of 22%.

As of the 2019–20 school year, the school had an enrollment of 544 students and 75.8 classroom teachers (on an FTE basis), for a student–teacher ratio of 7.2:1. The school's student body was 41.0% (223) White, 34.9% (190) Asian, 11.2% (61) Black, 7.4% (40) two or more races and 5.5% (30) Hispanic. Peddie had 62% of students in residence. The student body represented 26 states as well as 29 foreign countries. Peddie had an average class size of 12. 

Peter Quinn succeeded John Green as head of school in 2013.

History
What is now The Peddie School was founded in 1864 as the Hightstown Female Seminary, an American Baptist school. Later that year, boys were admitted and it changed its name for the first time, to New Jersey Classical and Scientific Institute. In 1872, it became the Peddie Institute in honor of philanthropist and politician Thomas B. Peddie, who gave the school $25,000 (equivalent to $ in ). In 1923, the school was formally renamed The Peddie School.

Peddie remained coeducational until 1908, when, for social and economic reasons, it decided to begin admitting only boys. This decision was reversed in 1970 when girls began to be admitted again. The following year, Peddie's first female African-American student enrolled in the fall term.

Beginning in the 1930s, Peddie began to attract students from other countries including China and Central America. As of 2022, 21% of Peddie's students identified as international, with top countries including China, South Korea, and Canada.

In 1983, Walter Annenberg, class of 1927, made a gift of $12 million (equivalent to $ million in ) to Peddie, the largest donation to a secondary school at the time. Ten years later in 1993, Ambassador Annenberg topped his gift when he made the groundbreaking donation of $100 million (equivalent to $ million in ), allowing it to expand its facilities, financial aid, and teachers' compensation and housing; prior to the Annenberg donation, the school's endowment totaled $17 million.

As of 2022, Peddie's endowment remains at over $450 million.

Headmasters
Heads of school include:
 Edgar and Edwin Haas (1865–1868)
 Hiram A. Pratt (1869–1875)
 Laroy F. Griffin (1875–1876)
 E.P. Bond (1876–1877)
 E.J. Avery (1881)
 John Greene (1882–1889)
 Herbert Ellsworth Slaught (1889–1892)
 Joseph E. Perry (1892–1898)
 Roger W. Swetland (1898–1934)
 Wilbour E. Saunders (1935–1949)
 Carrol O. Morong (1949–1964)
 Albert L. Kerr (1964–1977)
 F. Edward Potter Jr. (1977–1988)
Anne L. Seltzer (1988–1989)
 Thomas A. Degray (1989–2001)
 John F. Green (2001–2013)
 Peter A. Quinn (2013–present)

Academics

Peddie uses a trimester program, with the academic year being divided into Fall, Winter, and Spring terms, each consisting of roughly 10 weeks. Classes run from Monday to Saturday, beginning at 8:00 am and ending at 3;10 pm. Wednesdays and Saturdays are half days with students ending at 1:45 pm and 12:15 pm, allowing for more time to contribute to athletics, volunteer work, clubs, and independent studies.

Many courses offered at Peddie are full-year courses, running from Fall to Spring term. Many electives run for one to two terms, allowing students to take multiple different courses throughout the year. The majority of students take five courses each term. A select few students take six or seven courses at a time. Students at Peddie are required to take multiple courses in English, foreign language, mathematics (through precalculus), history, social science, laboratory science, art, and music. Additionally, Peddie students are required to participate in after-school activities throughout the year, including sports, theater productions, volunteer opportunities, and clubs. Students can request to have a course formed if they have a faculty representative and have demonstrated interest in the subject.

Peddie offers 34 subjects for Advanced Placement (AP). In the 2020-2021 school year, 124 students participated in AP classes and exams. The average score on AP exams for a Peddie student is 4.4; 94% of Peddie students scored above a 3 on their AP exams.

Peddie does not rank students and does not release grade point averages, opting instead for a 0-100 grading scale. For the class of 2019, the average SAT score was a 1400. The average ACT composite score was a 31.

Signature Experience
Peddie offers a signature experience to all students. The signature experience allows students to pursue their in-depth academic and co-curricular passions. Students begin to design their program during their sophomore year, with them conducting research and traveling during the summer between their junior and senior years. The program allows students to conduct research in any subject they are interested in, including STEM, English, Language, history, writing, and the arts. Many students focused on STEM conduct research in large, university labs, including University of California, Berkley and Princeton University. Each year, students who participate in STEM-EXP present their research to students in a research fair during their senior year.

Athletics

All students must participate in theater, be on an interscholastic team, or be in one of the elective physical-education classes after school.

The Ian H. Graham Athletic Center houses a swimming pool; three basketball courts (surrounded by an indoor Tartan track); a wrestling room; an indoor soccer and lacrosse facility with Astroturf, a 2,000-square-foot (190- m²) fitness center with state-of-the-art equipment; a room housing thirty ergometers; and a fully equipped 6-bed training room and sports-medicine center. Outdoor facilities include fourteen tennis courts, eight multipurpose fields, a specially equipped varsity football and lacrosse training field, a softball field, an Olympic-caliber ¼-mile all-weather track, a varsity football and lacrosse field, three baseball fields. The Hovnanian Fields added another six fields, dedicated seasonally to the freshmen and junior varsity soccer and lacrosse teams.

The Athletic Center holds a replica of the Heisman Trophy donated to the school by Yale University lineman Larry Kelley (Peddie class of 1933), who won it in 1936, the second year in which it was given.

Peddie has its own 18-hole golf course, where the boys' and girls' golf teams compete. The course is a private facility of the Peddie Golf Club, but students and faculty have free access to the greens.

The school competes in the Mid-Atlantic Prep League, a sports league with participating institutions from preparatory schools in the New Jersey, New York and Pennsylvania area.

Peddie is a member of the New Jersey Independent School Athletic Association (NJISAA), competing in the "Prep 'A'" division with Lawrenceville School, Hun School of Princeton, Blair Academy, Saint Benedict's Preparatory School and other New Jersey preparatory schools depending on the sport. Peddie has graduates competing at the collegiate level in swimming, wrestling, basketball, track, crew, baseball, softball, soccer, lacrosse, golf, and tennis. The school mascot is the falcon.

The girls track team won the New Jersey indoor track Non-Public / Prep state championship in 1928 and 1929.

Football rivalry
Peddie's arch-rival is Blair Academy, and the two schools compete every year during the second week of November for the Potter-Kelley Cup. The day of the football competition, which alternates yearly between campuses, is known as Blair Day at Peddie (and Peddie Day at Blair). The game between the two schools is the oldest football rivalry in New Jersey and ranks among the oldest in the country.

Crew
Peddie's crew team was first recognized on the national stage in 1993, when the men's midweight 4+ won a Youth National Championship title in Occaquan, VA. This feat was nearly repeated three years later, with Peddie coming in second in the same event by less than half a second. In 2006, the Peddie Girls' Varsity Four won the United States Youth National Championship, a regatta hosting the strongest club and scholastic teams in the nation. They won again in 2007, defending their U.S. Youth National Regatta title. In 2008, Peddie's Girls' Varsity Four placed third in their division at the Head of the Charles Regatta and returned to the Youth National in Ohio, placing second. The men's varsity four also traveled to Ohio, placing twelve in the Varsity Lightweight Four event. In 2009 the girls and boys returned to the National Championships. The girls regained their first place position, and the men placed sixth in the Petite Final of the Heavyweight Varsity Four. The women then continued on to the Henley Women's Regatta in England, setting a course record on their way to the final and eventually placing second.

Swimming
Peddie also boasts a nationally-acclaimed swimming program. Peddie School swimmers (students or alumni) have represented their nations in every Olympics since 1992. The team has won the Swimming World Mythical National Championships eight times, including the inaugural boys' and girls' independent-school titles in 1977 and 1982. The teams in the early 1990s were among the most-dominant high-school swimming programs in history, winning back-to-back boys' and girls' Mythical titles in 1990 and 1991. The 1994-95 team was the only team ever to lead the nation in all six relays. In 2007 both the girls' and boys' teams claimed first place at the Eastern Interscholastic Swimming and Diving Championships held at La Salle University in Philadelphia, Pennsylvania. During the 2007 championships, Peddie broke three national independent-school records in the girls' relay events. In 2011, 2012, 2013, 2015, 2016 and 2017 the Peddie's boys swim team won the Eastern Interscholastic Swimming and Diving Championships, continuing their success.

The boys swimming team won the New Jersey Non-Public state championship in 1951.

Basketball
In 2010, the girls' basketball team won the ESPN National High School Invitational, defeating Oak Hill Academy by a score of 60-44 in the tournament final and finishing the season with a 25-2 record. From 2000-2010 the girls' basketball program has been ranked one of the top 25 teams in the country seven times. During this same time period, three McDonald's All-Americans played for the Falcons including: Crystal Goring '05 (Richmond), Bridgette Mitchell '06 (Duke) and Haley Peters '10 (Duke).

Notable alumni

Notable alumni of the Peddie School include:

 Walter Annenberg (1908-2002; class of 1927), former US Ambassador to the United Kingdom and founder of TV Guide and Seventeen magazines.
 Roberto Arias (1918–1989), former Panamanian Ambassador to the United Kingdom.
 B. J. Bedford (born 1972), Olympic gold-medalist swimmer (women's 4x100 metre medley relay team) in the 2000 Summer Olympics in Sydney, Australia.
 Paul Benacerraf (born 1931), philosopher working in the field of the philosophy of mathematics.
 Heath Benedict (1983–2008), Dutch American football player.
 Breland (born 1995, class of 2013), country singer/songwriter
 Matt Brown (born 1989), professional football player.
 George Case (1915–1989), 11-year Major League Baseball outfielder.
 Finn M. W. Caspersen (1941-2009, class of 1959), financier, philanthropist, CEO of Beneficial Corporation and Knickerbocker Management.
 Leslie Caveny (class of 1980), film / television writer and producer known for her work on Everybody Loves Raymond.
 Chingo Bling (born 1979), Mexican-American rapper and record executive.
 Duane 'Dewey' Clarridge (born 1932), former CIA operative and author of A Spy for All Seasons, his memoirs.
 Pia Clemente (class of 1989), received Academy Award nomination for Best Live Action Short Film for her film, Our Time is Up.
 Oliver Crane (born 1998), rower, who set the record as the youngest person to row solo across the Atlantic Ocean, when he completed the  journey in 2018.
 Ronald S. Dancer (born 1949), politician who has served in the New Jersey General Assembly since 2002.
 Nelson Diebel (born 1970), double Olympic gold-medalist swimmer at the 1992 Summer Olympics in Barcelona, Spain.
 Phil Evans (journalist) (1933–2011), journalist, editor of The Baltimore Sun and The Washington Times.
 Colin Ferrell (born 1984), defensive tackle for the Indianapolis Colts, who played collegiate football at Kent State University.
 Elmer H. Geran (1875-1964; class of 1895), United States Representative from New Jersey's 3rd congressional district from 1925-1927.
 Erik Hanson (born 1965; class of 1983), pitcher who played for 11 years in Major League Baseball.
 Richard Hooker (1924–1997), author of M*A*S*H, which spawned the film of the same name and the subsequent M*A*S*H television series.
 Tim Hurson (born 1946; class of 1963), speaker, writer, creativity theorist, author of Think Better: An Innovator's Guide to Productive Thinking.
 Larry Kelley (1915–2000), winner of the 1936 Heisman Trophy.
 Howard W. Koch (1916–2001), film producer and director whose movies include Airplane! and The Odd Couple.
 Robert B. Kugler (born 1950; class of 1968), senior United States district judge of the United States District Court for the District of New Jersey and also serving as a judge on the United States Foreign Intelligence Surveillance Court.
 Reid Lamberty (born 1973; class of 1992), former television anchor for Fox 5 New York, now anchor at NBC affiliate WHDH, Channel 7, Boston.
 E. Grey Lewis (1940–2005), lawyer who served as General Counsel of the Navy.
 Mike Maccagnan (class of 1985), General Manager of the New York Jets.
 W. Steelman Mathis (1898–1981), politician who served in the New Jersey Senate from 1941 to 1942 and 1947 to 1966.
 John J. McCloy (1895–1989), Assistant Secretary of War during World War II, president of the World Bank and U.S. High Commissioner for Germany.
 Pat Miller, head coach of the Wake Forest Demon Deacons football team from 1929 to 1932.
 Eric Munoz (1947–2009), physician and politician, who served in the New Jersey General Assembly from 2001 until his death.
 B. Russell Murphy (1889-1957, class of 1909), athlete, coach, and athletics administrator during the early 20th century, who was the first basketball coach at Johns Hopkins University.
 George Murphy (1902–1992), Academy Award-winning actor, president of the Screen Actors Guild and U.S. Senator for California, 1964–1971.
 Hossein Nasr (born 1933; class of 1950), Iranian philosopher. 
 David Paddock (1892–1962), All-American college football player for the Georgia Bulldogs.
 Fernando Perez (born 1983), Major League Baseball player for the Tampa Bay Rays and the Chicago Cubs, and published poet in Poetry magazine.
 Haley Peters (born 1992), professional women's basketball forward with the Atlanta Dream of the Women's National Basketball Association.
 John Plant (1877–1954), basketball player who served as head coach for the Bucknell Bison men's basketball team from 1926-1932.
 Jules Prown (born 1930), art historian.
 Myron Rolle (born 1986), Rhodes Scholar who played safety in the NFL for the Tennessee Titans.
 Richard Sachs (born 1953; class of 1971), custom bicycle frame maker.
 Nat Sakdatorn (born 1983), winner of Thailand's reality-television singing contest Academy Fantasia (Season 4) and now a singer-songwriter in the Thai music industry under the label "True Fantasia".
 Gerald Schnitzer (class of 1936), screenwriter, author, producer and TV director for Lassie and National Velvet.
 Billy Schuler (born 1990), soccer player for the Carolina RailHawks in the North American Soccer League.
 Alan Shapley (1903–1973), Lieutenant General in the United States Marine Corps and a recipient of the Navy Cross.
 Heather J. Sharkey (born 1967, class of 1985), Marshall Scholar, Fulbright-Hays Scholar, historian of the Middle East and Africa at the University of Pennsylvania, author
 Lloyd Spencer (1893–1981), politician who served as United States Senator from the state of Arkansas from 1941 to 1943.
 Jonathan Sprout (born 1952), songwriter, performer and recording artist.
 Stanley Steingut (1920–1989), New York Assemblyman (1953–1978), Minority Leader of the Assembly (1969–1974), Speaker of the New York Assembly (1975–1978), and Chairman of the Brooklyn Democratic Committee (1962–1969).
 Chris Tomson (born 1984), drummer of indie rock band, Vampire Weekend.
 Larry Townsend (1930–2008), author of dozens of books including The Leatherman's Handbook (1972).
 Richard Tregaskis (1916–1973), war correspondent and author of Guadalcanal Diary, the source for the 1943 film of the same name starring William Bendix, Richard Conte, and Anthony Quinn.
 Lew Tucker (born 1950), computer scientist, open source advocate and industry executive
 Hakeem Valles (born 1992; class of 2011), American football player
 E. Norman Veasey (born 1933), Chief Justice of the Delaware Supreme Court.
 Albert L. Vreeland (1901-1975; class of 1922), U.S. Representative from New Jersey.
 Glen Everett Woolfenden (1930–2007), ornithologist, known for his long-term study of the Florida scrub jay population at Archbold Biological Station near Lake Placid, Florida.

References

External links
Official site
Data for the Peddie School, National Center for Education Statistics

1864 establishments in New Jersey
Boarding schools in New Jersey
Educational institutions established in 1864
Middle States Commission on Secondary Schools
Preparatory schools in New Jersey
Private high schools in Mercer County, New Jersey
Hightstown, New Jersey